Ford Edwards Stinson, Sr. (August 24, 1914 – September 22, 1989) was a member of the Louisiana House of Representatives from 1940–1944 and again from 1952-1972.

Background

He attained the rank of lieutenant colonel and was awarded the Bronze Star.  He was also awarded the European-African-Middle Eastern Campaign Medal with five bronze battle stars for the Tunisia, Sicily, Naples-Foggia, Rome-Arno, and Northern Apennines campaigns.  He was active in the American Legion, the Veterans of Foreign Wars, the Community Chest, and the United Methodist Church.  In November 2013, he was posthumously inducted into the Louisiana State University Military Hall of Honor.

Personal life

Stinson and his wife, the former Edna Earle Richardson of Shreveport, had a daughter, Mary Carol, a daughter, Janet, and a son, Ford E. Stinson, Jr., a former 26th Judicial District judge based in Benton. The junior Stinson announced his retirement at the end of 2014 after eighteen years in the position.  One of his grandsons, Douglas M. Stinson, was elected 26th Judicial District judge on March 26, 2022.

References

1914 births
1989 deaths
Democratic Party members of the Louisiana House of Representatives
Louisiana city council members
People from Benton, Louisiana
Louisiana lawyers
Louisiana State University Law Center alumni
United States Army Air Forces personnel of World War II
20th-century American lawyers
20th-century American politicians
American United Methodists
20th-century Methodists
21st-century Methodists
United States Army Air Forces colonels